Farkhad Magametov (born 11 January 1962 in the Uzbek SSR, Soviet Union) is a retired football defender. Magametov is a former Uzbekistani international, who obtained a total number of 20 caps during his career, scoring no goals.

Club career 
Magametov started his career in 1981 for Pakhtakor Tashkent. He played one season at the Soviet highest league level and he collected 27 matches as a defender.

International career 
Farkhad Magametov made his debut for the Uzbekistan national team in a friendly match against Kyrgyzstan on 23 August 1992. Two years later he competed at the 1994 Asian Games, which his team won. He was one of the major players, playing every match. He was playing in different positions including left-back, right-back, centre-back as well defensive midfielder due to his decent pass technique.

On 19 June 1996 Magametov participated in the second match against Tajikistan  His team won 5-0 and advanced to the Asian Cup, on goal advantage. At this tournament Magametov was named the captain of the national team. It was the first Asian Cup for their country, held in the United Arab Emirates. He showed strong defensive abilities during the winning match against China. It was historical first win at the Asian Cup, but Uzbekistan failed to advance to the second round, due to two losses against Syria and Japan. 

He retired shortly after this tournament and was named Uzbekistan's second best football player in the same year.

References

RSSSF

1962 births
Living people
Sportspeople from Tashkent
Soviet footballers
Uzbekistani footballers
Uzbekistan international footballers
1996 AFC Asian Cup players
Association football defenders
Pakhtakor Tashkent FK players
FK Dinamo Samarqand players
FC Kaisar players
FC Sogdiana Jizzakh players
navbahor Namangan players
Asian Games gold medalists for Uzbekistan
Asian Games medalists in football
Footballers at the 1994 Asian Games
Medalists at the 1994 Asian Games